MAFC may refer to:

Ministry of Agriculture, Food and Cooperatives
Magnesium-air fuel cell
Millbrook A.F.C.
Mossley A.F.C.
Motor Action F.C.
Murton A.F.C.
Musselburgh Athletic F.C.
Mwana Africa F.C.
MAFC (basketball), (Műegyetemi Atlétikai és Football Club), a Hungarian men's basketball club based in Budapest.